The chief minister of Singapore was the head of government of the Colony of Singapore until its abolition on 3 June 1959. It was replaced by the office of Prime Minister. The chief minister was appointed by the governor of Singapore. The chief minister was the party leader of the majority in the Legislative Assembly.

Background
In February 1955, a new constitution, the Rendel Constitution, was implemented. Singapore would create its first Legislative Assembly with majority of the seats popularly elected, to replace the existing Legislative Council. 25 out of 32 seats would be elected by the general populace, four seats would be allocated to unofficial members appointed by the governor, three seats taken by ex officio members, respectively the chief secretary, attorney-general and financial secretary, while the remaining seat would be for the unofficial speaker of the Assembly nominated by the governor. 

Moreover, the office of Chief Minister was added, which would be assumed by the leader of the majority party in the Assembly, sharing the responsibility with Chief Secretary, Attorney-General and Financial Secretary. 

The chief secretary continued to take control over areas such as foreign affairs, defense , administration,  internal security , broadcasting and public relations, whereas the power of policy-making for the people's welfare lay in the hands of the chief minister.

List of chief ministers

See also
 Governor of Singapore
 Chief Secretary of Singapore
 Prime Minister of Singapore

References

1955 establishments in Singapore
1959 disestablishments in Singapore
Government ministers of Singapore